Jet Asia Airways was a Thai airline based out of Suvarnabhumi International Airport in Bangkok, Thailand. Jet Asia Airways offered full-service scheduled and chartered services as well as long- and short-term ACMI flights (also known as wet leases).

History
Jet Asia Airways was founded in December 2009 with two Boeing 767-200 aircraft, and received its air operator's certificate (AOC) in October 2010. It joined the Pacific Asia Travel Association on September 1, 2011. Its first commercial flight was on September 17, 2011, between Bangkok’s Don Muang International Airport and Penang International Airport in Malaysia.

From February through May 2012, Jet Asia flew daily charters between Bangkok’s Suvarnabhumi International Airport and Tokyo’s Narita International Airport on behalf of Japanese travel agency H.I.S. Seasonal charters between Bangkok and Tokyo resumed on July 2012 and again in July 2013 with additional service to Osaka. Starting in January 2013, after partnering with CITS Air Service (a subsidiary of China International Travel Service, China’s largest integrated travel network), the airline began operating charters to more than 40 cities and offering regularly scheduled service between Bangkok, Phuket and six cities in China: Beijing, Nanjing, Chongqing, Tianjin, Shenyang and Changsha.

In late 2014 the airline began four times weekly scheduled services to Tokyo (Narita) using Boeing 767-200 aircraft. Further scheduled services to be launched include Jakarta, Jeddah and Tianjin.

Destinations

Fleet

The Jet Asia Airways fleet consisted of the following aircraft (as of August 2016):

References

External links

 Official website 

Defunct airlines of Thailand
Airlines established in 2009
Airlines disestablished in 2020
Companies based in Bangkok
Thai companies established in 2009